(NJPW), is a Japanese professional wrestling promotion based in Nakano, Tokyo. Former employees in NJPW consist of professional wrestlers, managers, valets, play-by-play and color commentators, announcers, interviewers, referees, trainers, script writers, executives, and members of the board of directors.

Personnel

Notable former wrestlers

Japanese wrestlers

 Akira (Akira Nogami)
 Akiya Anzawa
 Atsushi Aoki 
 Ayato Yoshida
 Masahiro Chono
 Riki Choshu (Mitsuo Yoshida)
 Super Delfin (Hiroto Wakita)
 Tatsumi Fujinami
 Kazuyuki Fujita
 Yoshiaki Fujiwara
 Masakatsu Funaki
 Tatsutoshi Goto
 Shinya Hashimoto 
 HUB
 Kendo Kashin (Tokimitsu Ishizawa)
 Masahito Kakihara
 Kamikaze
 Koji Kanemoto
 W*ING Kanemura (Yukihiro Kanemura)
 Toshiaki Kawada
 Kenta Kobashi
 Osamu Kido
 Kengo Kimura (Seiei Kimura)
 Shiro Koshinaka
 Shunji Kosugi
 Akira Maeda
 Naomichi Marufuji
 Kengo Mashimo
 Mitsuharu Misawa 
 Shigeo Miyato
 Kazunari Murakami
 Keiji Mutoh
 Mitsuya Nagai
 Hiroshi Nagao
 Katsuhiko Nagata
 Masayuki Naruse
 Osamu Nishimura
 Nosawa Rongai / Black Tiger (Kazushige Nosawa)
 Michiyoshi Ohara
 Okumura (Shigeo Okumura)
 Takao Omori
 Akitoshi Saito
 Hiro Saito
 Masa Saito 
 Kazushi Sakuraba
 El Samurai (Osamu Matsuda)
 Naoki Sano
 Daisuke Sasaki
 Kensuke Sasaki
 The Great Sasuke (Masanori Murakawa)
 Kenzo Suzuki
 Tajiri (Yoshihiro Tajiri)
 Tatsuhito Takaiwa
 Nobuhiko Takada
 Yoshihiro Takayama
 Katsushi Takemura
 Masato Tanaka
 Minoru Tanaka
 Genichiro Tenryu
 Kaji Tomato
 Takashi Uwano
 Naofumi Yamamoto / Yoshitatsu
 Kazuo Yamazaki
 Ryushi Yanagisawa
 Tadao Yasuda
 Yoshiaki Yatsu

Non-Japanese wrestlers

 Abdullah The Butcher (Lawrence Shreeve)
 American Dragon (Bryan Danielson)
 Arn Anderson (Martin Lunde)
 André the Giant (André Roussimoff) 
 Ángel de Oro
 Kurt Angle
 Averno (Renato Ruíz)
 Sangre Azteca
 Steve Austin (Steven Williams)
 Bob Backlund
 Michael Bennett
 Rey Bucanero (Arturo García)
 The Barbarian (Sione Vailahi)
 Crusher Bam Bam Bigelow (Scott Bigelow) 
 Black Tiger (Mark Rocco) 
 Black Tiger (II) (Eddie Guerrero) 
 Black Tiger (III) (César González) 
 Blue Wolf (Dolgorsürengiin Serjbüdee)
 Wes Brisco
 Jay Briscoe 
 Mark Briscoe
 Bruiser Brody (Frank Goodish) 
 Chyna (Joanie Laurer) 
 Adam Cole (Austin Jenkins)
 Rob Conway
 Consequences Creed (Austin Watson)
 Jay White
 Jax Dane
 Christopher Daniels / Curry Man (Daniel Covell)
 Diamante Azul
 Dr. Wagner Jr. (Juan González)
 Dynamite Kid (Thomas Billington) 
 Troy Endres  
 Ric Flair (Richard Fliehr)
 Fuego
 Rick Fuller
 Amber Gallows (Kimberly Davis)
 Héctor Garza (Héctor Solano) 
 Giant Bernard (Matthew Bloom)
 Chavo Guerrero Jr.
 Karl Gotch (Karl Istaz) 
 Daniel Gracie (Daniel Simoes)
 Rolles Gracie (Rolles Gracie Jr.)
 Cody Hall
 Scott Hall
 Tony Halme 
 Stan Hansen (John Hansen Jr.)
 Jeff Hardy
 Bret Hart
 Owen Hart 
 Salman Hashimikov
 Hulk Hogan (Terry Bollea)
 Maria Kanellis
 Brian Kendrick
 Jay Lethal (Jamar Shipman)
 Low Ki (Brandon Silvestry)
 Dean Malenko (Dean Simon)
 Máximo (José Alvarado)
 Mephisto
 Místico (Luis Urive)
 Místico (II) (Carlos Muñoz)
 Punisher Dice Morgan (Mark Calaway)
 Dick Murdoch 
 MVP (Hassan Assad)
 Jim Neidhart 
 Niebla Roja
 Scott Norton
 Quiet Storm
 Pac (Ben Satterley)
 Pinoy Boy (Teddy Perkins)
 Pegasus Kid / Wild Pegasus (Chris Benoit) 
 Daniel Puder
 Jimmy Rave (James Guffey) 
 Rey Cometa (Mario González)
 Rey Escorpión (Fabian Nuñez)
 Davey Richards (Wesley Richards)
 Billy Robinson 
 Robert Roode
 Rick Rude (Richard Rood) 
 Rush (William Muñoz)
 Chris Sabin (Joshua Harter)
 Sabu (Terry Brunk)
 Giant Singh (Dalip Singh)
 Giant Silva (Paulo César da Silva)
 Slex
 La Sombra (Manuel Andrade)
 James Storm (James Cox)
 Stuka Jr.
 Tiger Jeet Singh (Jagjit Singh)
 Davey Boy Smith (David Smith) 
 Rick Steiner (Robert Rechsteiner)
 Scott Steiner (Scott Rechsteiner)
 Sting (Steve Borden)
 Strong Man (Jon Andersen)
 Matt Sydal (Matthew Korklan)
 Michael Tarver (Tyrone Evans)
 Matt Taven (Matthew Marinelli)
 Terry Taylor (Paul Taylor III)
 Terrible (Damián Gutiérrez)
 El Texano Jr. (Juan Aguilar)
 Titán
 Travis Tomko
 Último Guerrero (José Gutiérrez)
 Rob Van Dam (Robert Szatkowski)
 Big Van Vader (Leon White) 
 Vangellys
 Volador Jr. (Ramón Ibarra)
 Road Warrior Animal (Joseph Laurinaitis) 
 Road Warrior Hawk (Michael Hegstrand) 
 Barry Windham
 Hanson
 Raymond Rowe
 Hangman Page (Stevie Woltz)

Joshi talent

Kaoru Ito
Manami Toyota
Momoe Nakanishi
Sachie Abe
The Bloody
Yumiko Hotta

References

New Japan Pro-Wrestling
Lists of professional wrestling personnel